The 17th Raider Infantry Brigade / Kujang I (abbreviated The 17th Raider Brigade / Kujang I) is a Brigade level unit in the 1st Kostrad Infantry Division, a branch of the Indonesian Army. The Raiders Brigade consists of three battalions:

 Airborne Raider Infantry Battalion 305 / Skull (Karawang, West Java)
 Airborne Raider Infantry Battalion 328 / Dirgahayu (Cilodong, Depok, West Java)
 Airborne Raider Infantry Battalion 330 / Tri Dharma (Cicalengka, Bandung Regency, West Java).

The unit's Command Headquarters (Mako) "Brigadier Raider 17 / Kujang I" is located in Cijantung, East Jakarta. This brigade was established on May 20, 1966. This unit was previously named the 17th Para Raider Infantry Brigade / Kujang I.

References 

Army units and formations of Indonesia
Indonesian Army